The city of Worcester, Massachusetts has a long and rich history and a great many properties and districts listed on the National Register of Historic Places.  There are 285 properties and districts listed on the National Register in the city.

Current listings
Because of the large number of listings, the list has been split into three sections.  Eastern Worcester is all of the city east of the north-south route of I-190 and I-290.  Northwestern Worcester is the part of the city west of those highways and north of Massachusetts Route 122. Finally, southwestern Worcester covers the area south of Route 122 and west of the highways.

Two historic districts have boundaries that cover portions of more than one section of the city: milestones that make up the 1767 Milestones are found in the northwestern and eastern sections, and the Blackstone Canal Historic District extends through all three sections.

References

Buildings and structures in Worcester, Massachusetts
History of Worcester, Massachusetts
 
Worcester, Massachusetts-related lists